Toss is a 2009 Bollywood Hindi movie directed by Ramesh Khatkar.
Toss is Rannvijay Singh's debut film.

Cast
Ashmit Patel as Josh
Prashant Raj as Samay
Rannvijay Singh as Ryan
Aarti Chhabria as Sasha
Nyra Banerjee as Sherry
Shruti Gera as Fiona
Zakir Hussain as Inspector Denzel d'Cunha
Sushant Singh as Two
Mahesh Manjrekar as Dada
Rajpal Yadav as Duffy
Hardik Sangani as Sadaa

Soundtrack
The soundtrack of Toss consists of 4 songs and two remixes.

"Ruppaia"
"Meri Khamoshi"
"Aish Aish"
"Abe Saale"
"Chalte Chalo"
"Abe Saale" (Remix)
"Aish Aish" (Remix)

Reception
Sukanya Verma of Rediff.com in a negative review called the film "a laughable attempt" and felt that the film "is a text-book demonstration of appalling, over-the-top and awful performances. Not one actor in a cast of mostly lesser known faces project anything remotely to an expression." Taran Adarsh of Bollywood Hungama rated the film 1 out of 5 stars, stating "Debutante director Ramesh Khatkar seems to have concentrated more on making a technically attractive project, instead of telling an absorbing story. Music [Sandesh Shandilya and Siddharth-Suhas] isn't invigorating either. Background score [Ranjit Barot] is far more effective. The visuals [DoP: Anil Akki], of course, are good and that's what you carry home" Shubhra Gupta of The Indian Express gave the film 2 out of 5 stars, stating "Toss starts off as a dark Bollywood-via-Hollywood thriller,throwing up a few interesting twists off and on. The characters are satisfactorily weird,but the acting,overall,is patchy. It also gets much too stretched,and we can see the twist in the climax long before it comes."

References

External links

2000s Hindi-language films
2009 films